Paul-Louis is a masculine French given name. Notable people with the name include:

 Paul-Louis Carrière (1908-2008), French prelate of the Roman Catholic Church
 Paul-Louis Couchoud (1879-1959), French author and poet
 Paul Louis Courier (1773-1825), French Hellenist and political writer
 Paul-Louis Halley (1934-2003), French businessman
 Paul-Louis Rossi (born 1933), French critic and poet
 Paul-Louis Roubert (born 1967), associate researcher at the Laboratoire d'histoire visuelle contemporaine
 Paul-Louis Simond (1858-1947), French physician and biologist
 Paul-Louis Weiller (1893-1993), French businessman and industrial

Compound given names
French masculine given names